Ashley Bryant (born 17 May 1991) is a British athlete, specialising in the decathlon. He is a member of Windsor, Slough, Eton and Hounslow Athletic Club and is coached by Aston Moore. Bryant has represented Great Britain at the IAAF World Athletics Championships and England at the Commonwealth Games, a silver medallist in the latter.

Career

2010 
Bryant captained his country at the 2010 World Junior Championships in Athletics in Moncton, Canada.

2011 
A European Cup 1st League bronze medallist in 2011, he went on to compete in the World Student Games in Shenzhen, China as a 20-year-old, placing fifth.

2013 
In 2013, at the age of 22, Bryant was the best decathlete in the United Kingdom. He was ranked in the top ten for under-23s in the long jump and several other single events, and the top 20 among senior athletes. At the 2013 European Athletics U23 Championships, he came fourth and achieved his personal best of 8070 points. It was the first time in the history of these Championships that 8000 points did not place in the top three.

2014 
He won a silver medal in the men's decathlon at the 2014 Commonwealth Games.

Personal bests 
Outdoor

Indoor

References

External links 
 
 
 

1991 births
Living people
British decathletes
English decathletes
British male athletes
Athletes from London
People from Hammersmith
Athletes (track and field) at the 2014 Commonwealth Games
Commonwealth Games medallists in athletics
Commonwealth Games silver medallists for England
Medallists at the 2014 Commonwealth Games